Dmitry Saveliev is a Russian former pair skater. With Inga Korshunova, he won the 1993 1993 World Junior Championships and the 1992 Blue Swords. Silver Medalist at the 1993 Junior Russian Nationals. They were coached by Valeriy Tiukov and Valentina Tiukova at SDIUSHOR Orlenok in Perm.

References

Navigation

Russian male pair skaters
Living people
World Junior Figure Skating Championships medalists
Sportspeople from Perm, Russia
Year of birth missing (living people)